Pablo Quert (born Pablo Raúl Quert Álvarez in 1957 in Guantánamo, Cuba) is a Cuban artist specializing in painting, drawing and engraving.

He studied at the Escuela Nacional de Bellas Artes "San Alejandro" in Havana and later he continue his art formation at the Instituto Superior de Arte.

Quert has had several solo shows Pinturas de Pablo Quert in the Pequeño Salón at the Museo Nacional de Bellas Artes de La Habana; in 1979 Grabados at the Lalit Kala Akademi in New Delhi, India and in 1995 Confluencias. Pablo Quert. Dibujos Pinturas Grabados in the Sala de Exposición of COVICICA in Caracas, Venezuela.

Quert's works has been presented in collective exhibitions such as the 1st Bienal de La Habana at the Museo Nacional de Bellas Artes de La Habana; at the Intergrafik’84. Ausstellungszentrum am Fernsehturm in Berlin, Germany; and at the 12th International Independent Exhibition of Prints in Kanagawa Prefectural Gallery in Kanagawa, Japan.

He has also obtained awards and recognitions such as the prize in the Salón Plaza’85, at the Centro de Arte 23 y 12 in Havana, Cuba. He gained also the Honorable Mention Award in La Joven Estampa a young print competition organized by Casa de las Américas.

His works are part of the permanent exhibitions at the Centro Wifredo Lam in Havana; the Galería Latinoamericana in Cracovia, Slovenia; the Contemporary Art Museum in Cairo, Egypt and at the Museo Nacional de Bellas Artes de La Habana.

References
  Jose Veigas-Zamora, Cristina Vives Gutierrez, Adolfo V. Nodal, Valia Garzon, Dannys Montes de Oca; Memoria: Cuban Art of the 20th Century; (California/International Arts Foundation 2001); 
 Jose Viegas; Memoria: Artes Visuales Cubanas Del Siglo Xx; (California International Arts 2004);  .

Cuban contemporary artists
People from Guantánamo
1957 births
Living people
Instituto Superior de Arte alumni